Leslie Alfred Watt (9 December 1912 – 20 January 1949) was a former Australian rules footballer who played with  and  in the Victorian Football League (VFL).

A talented sprinter, he came fourth in the 1936 Stawell Gift, after being named as one of the favourites in the lead up to the race, winning the Eltham Gift the previous week.

Notes

External links 

		
Les Watt's profile at Collingwood Forever

1912 births
1949 deaths
Australian rules footballers from Victoria (Australia)
Collingwood Football Club players
Fitzroy Football Club players
Australian male sprinters
Rochester Football Club players